Verner Emil Hoggatt Jr. (June 26, 1921 – August 11, 1980) was an American mathematician, known mostly for his work in Fibonacci numbers and number theory.

Hoggatt received a Ph.D. from Oregon State University in 1955 for his dissertation on The Inverse Weierstrass P-Function.
Besides his contributions in Fibonacci numbers and number theory it is as the co-founder of the Fibonacci association and publisher of the associated journal Fibonacci Quarterly for which he is best remembered.

Howard Eves commented, "During his long and outstanding tenure at San Jose State University, Vern directed an enormous number of master's theses, and put out an amazing number of attractive papers... He became the authority on Fibonacci and related numbers."

See also
Fibonacci numbers
The Fibonacci Association
Alfred Brousseau

References

Verner Hoggatt Biography
Fibonacci mathematicians of the 20th century

External links
The Official website of the Fibonacci Association
The Fibonacci Quarterly

1921 births
1980 deaths
20th-century American mathematicians
Number theorists
Oregon State University alumni
San Jose State University faculty